Muck is a stream in the U.S. state of Washington.

The name Muck is derived from an old variant name of Roy, Washington.

See also
List of rivers of Washington

References

Rivers of Pierce County, Washington
Rivers of Washington (state)